Quinidius (died February 15 c. 579) was a French hermit, deacon, and bishop, who acquired the reputation of being a  saint.  He was born at Vaison-la-Romaine to a noble Christian family.  As a young man, he became a hermit near Toulon and then at Lérins Abbey to devote himself to a life of prayer and asceticism.

Esteemed for his piety, he was recalled to his natal town by Theodosius, Bishop of Vaison.  He was made an archdeacon.  He was himself elected Bishop of Vaison in 556, and achieved a reputation for charity and fairness.  He participated in the Councils of Paris of 558 and 573.  He resisted the claims of the patrician Mummolus, conqueror of the Lombards.

Death and veneration
At his death, his body was placed under the main altar of the cathedral of Vaison.  A sarcophagus was unearthed there in 1950 which may contain the possible relics of Quinidius.  He was officially registered in the catalogue of saints during the papacy of Innocent III at the request of Rambaud Flotte, bishop of the city.

The apse of the Church of St. Quenin at Vaison seems to date from the 8th century; it is one of the oldest in France.

References

External links
Saints of February 15: Quinidius
 Saint Quenin de Vaison

579 deaths
People from Vaucluse
French hermits
Bishops of Vaison
6th-century Burgundian bishops
6th-century Christian saints
Year of birth unknown
556 births